Hontianske Moravce is a village situated in southern central Slovakia in Krupina District in the Banská Bystrica Region near the cities of Zvolen (50 km) and Levice (20 km).

Famous people
Jaro Filip, artist
Ladislav Svihran, writer

Genealogical resources

The records for genealogical research are available at the state archive "Statny Archiv in Bratislava, Banska Bystrica, Bytca, Kosice, Levoca, Nitra, Presov, Slovakia"

See also
 List of municipalities and towns in Slovakia

References

External links
 
 
Surnames of living people in Hontianske Moravce

Villages and municipalities in Krupina District